Navjeet Singh "Bob" Dhillon   is a Canadian property owner and businessman.

Early life and education
His family comes from Tallewal in the district of Barnala Punjab. This family belongs to Dhillon Jat, His grandfather moved to Hong Kong for business reasons and set-up the North China Shipping Company to carry out trade with Japan. Bob Singh Dhillon was born in Japan in 1965. He is a Punjabi speaker. His family lived in Liberia before settling in Canada in the 1970s. As a small child he was sent back to India for his schooling. He was educated at Bishop Cotton School (Shimla). After graduating from university, he completed his master's degree (MBA) at Richard Ivey School of Business at the University of Western Ontario. In 2021, Dhillon obtained his ICD.D designation through the Rotman School of Management. Dhillon has also been awarded an honorary doctorate in commerce from Lakehead University, and an honorary doctorate of laws from the University of Lethbridge.

Business
Dhillon founded Mainstreet Equity Corp in 1997, taking the company public and listing it on the Toronto Stock Exchange under (TSX: MEQ) in 2000. The Canada-based real estate company is the only Sikh-owned company listed on the Toronto Stock Exchange. Mainstreet owns nearly 16,000 rental units across Western Canada. Dhillon is developing a high-end tourist resort in Belize, a nation for which he is also the honorary consul general to Canada.

Philanthropy
In 2018 he made a $10 million donation to the University of Lethbridge – the largest donation in the university's history. The money is being used by the newly named Dhillon School of Business. Through Mainstreet, Dhillon has also provided homes for many refugees, including those fleeing Alberta wildfires in 2016, Afghans fleeing Taliban rule in 2021, and Ukrainians fleeing the Russian invasion in 2022.

Awards
On the 29th of December 2021, Her Excellency the Right Honorable Mary Simon, the Governor General appointed the Order of Canada to Dhillon. Officers of the Order of Canada (OC) have demonstrated an outstanding level of talent and service to Canadians.

References 

1965 births
Living people
Punjabi people
Businesspeople from Calgary
Officers of the Order of Canada
21st-century Canadian businesspeople
Bishop Cotton School Shimla alumni